WingHouse Bar & Grill (formerly Ker’s WingHouse Bar & Grill) is a restaurant chain based in Florida, created and founded by Ed Burnett, a Canadian restaurant entrepreneur. Expansion of the chain was financed by investor Crawford Ker (a former National Football League player). It is regarded as a “breastaurant” featuring “WingHouse Girls” as servers, similar to that of Hooters.

History
Burnett secured the rights to a closed restaurant ("Knockers") and opened "The WingHouse" restaurant in Largo, Florida. The restaurant imitated Hooters, but designed to be a family-friendly atmosphere. The chain's future locations expanded on this model. 

In 1994, Burnett took on an investor, Crawford Ker, to expand into a restaurant chain. The initial goal was to open 20 to 50 locations, and then sell the chain to a larger restaurant chain or investors. Two additional locations were opened in the Tampa Bay area from 1994-1997.

As of 2007, the company had 1,700 employees at 22 locations with revenue of nearly $60 million. The company participated in, the 2007 National Buffalo Wing Festival and placed first in the traditional x-hot sauce category.

On June 4, 2008 the company announced the launch of its national franchise program. In mid-2008 the chain operated 19 locations in Florida and Texas and expected to add six franchises by the end of 2008, and 48 by 2011. The initial focus was for franchises in the Southeastern US.

WingHouses feature several amenities including a full liquor bar in every store, sports memorabilia decor, and in some locations, a game room.

Ownership history 
 ARC Group Inc. (Oct. 2019 - present)
 Soaring Wings LLC ( 2014 - Oct. 2019) Soaring Wings LLC is now inactive (as of 2021)

Controversy

Ker won a $1.2-million jury award from Hooters in late 2004, which had sued him for trademark violations for allegedly using their uniforms and decor. After a three-week trial, the jury ruled that no trademark infringement existed. Hooters appealed the decision, but in June 2006, the 11th U.S. Circuit Court of Appeals in Atlanta upheld the verdict.

References

 http://www.accessmylibrary.com/coms2/summary_0286-18257851_ITM

Restaurants in Florida
Regional restaurant chains in the United States
Restaurants in Texas
Restaurants established in 1994
1994 establishments in Florida